Hanna Victoria Hellquist née Hellqvist (born 24 July 1980), is a Swedish journalist, TV host and writer.

After internship at the National Swedish Labour Market Board (Arbetsmarknadsstyrelsen, AMS), Hellquist started working as journalist at Karlstads-Tidningen when she was 19 years old and after that she has worked at among TV4 Värmland, Göteborgs-Posten, Resumé and Dagens Nyheter (DN). On DN she was famous for her causeries in Namn & Nytt and later for her chronicles in På Stan and for her interviews in DN Söndag. Since January 2009 she hosts Morgonpasset on Sveriges Radio P3. In 2009 she hosted Sommar in Sveriges Radio P1.

In the spring of 2011, her TV-program Jakten på lyckan was broadcast on Sveriges Television. Earlier Hellquist studied gender studies at the University of Gothenburg. As author Hellquist has written among Karlstad Zoologiska (2009) which is about her father and when she grew up in Karlstad.

References

External links
Official website 
Hanna Hellquist on Albert Bonniers förlag's website

Living people
1980 births
People from Karlstad
Swedish journalists
Swedish women journalists
21st-century Swedish women writers
Swedish-language writers
Swedish television hosts
Swedish women television presenters